The  is an annual marathon sporting event for men and women over the classic distance of 42.195 kilometres which is held on the 2nd sunday of December in Nara, Nara Prefecture, Japan.

The race starts at Konoike Athletic Stadium, and after the course passes through Nara and Tenri cities, came back and finishes at Konoike Athletic Stadium.

Results
Key:

References

External links 
 Official website

Marathons in Japan
Recurring sporting events established in 2010
Sport in Nara Prefecture